Branislau Samoilau (born 25 May 1985) is a Belarusian road bicycle racer, who rides for Belarusian amateur team .

Career
Samoilau won the Belarusian National Road Race Championships in 2007. He was national time trial champion of Belarus in 2009, 2010 and 2012.

Samoilau did not compete in the professional peloton in 2013, but joined  for the 2014 season.

During the 2015 Tour of Austria, Samoilau was fined a month's salary by his team for having said "fucking nigger" to Natnael Berhane, a black rider from Eritrea.

Major results
Source: 

2004
 1st Liège–Bastogne–Liège U23
 1st Chieti–Casalincontrado–Blockhaus
 3rd GP Capodarco
 4th Overall Volta a Lleida
1st Mountains classification
 7th Overall Giro delle Regioni
1st Stage 5
2005
 1st  Time trial, National Under-23 Road Championships
 1st Overall Volta a Lleida
1st Stages 1, 2a (ITT) & 5
 1st Trofeo Franco Balestra
 1st Ruota d'Oro
 9th Time trial, UEC European Under-23 Road Championships
 10th Gran Premio Palio del Recioto
2006
 1st  Time trial, National Under-23 Road Championships
2007
 National Road Championships
1st  Road race
2nd Time trial
 3rd Giro del Lazio
 6th Time trial, UEC European Under-23 Road Championships
 9th Time trial, UCI Under-23 Road World Championships
 10th Gran Premio Città di Camaiore
2008
 1st Stage 5 Settimana Ciclistica Lombarda
 5th Overall Vuelta a Murcia
2009
 1st  Time trial, National Road Championships
 3rd Overall Tour of Austria
 10th Subida al Naranco
2010
 1st  Time trial, National Road Championships
2011
 3rd Road race, National Road Championships
2012
 1st  Time trial, National Road Championships
2013
 2nd Race Horizon Park II
 3rd Time trial, National Road Championships
 4th Overall Tour of Małopolska
1st Stage 3
 9th Overall Baltic Chain Tour
2014
 3rd Time trial, National Road Championships
 4th Overall Cycling Tour of Sibiu
1st Stages 2 & 3a (TTT)
 4th Coupe des Carpathes
2015
 2nd Time trial, National Road Championships
 6th Overall Tour of Croatia
2016
 National Road Championships
2nd Time trial
3rd Road race
2017
 1st Stage 1b (TTT) Settimana Internazionale di Coppi e Bartali
2018
 1st Race Horizon Park Maidan
 1st Race Horizon Park Classic
 1st Stage 2 Tour of Mersin
 National Road Championships
2nd Time trial
3rd Road race
 2nd Minsk Cup
 3rd Grand Prix Side
 4th Overall Tour de Serbie
1st Stage 3
 9th Overall Tour of Almaty
 10th Grand Prix Alanya
2019
 1st  Overall Tour of Mesopotamia
1st Stage 1
 1st Grand Prix Gazipaşa
 2nd Time trial, National Road Championships
 2nd Overall Tour of Mersin
1st Stage 1
 8th Overall Tour of China I
 10th Overall Tour of Qinghai Lake
 10th Overall Tour of Xingtai
2020
 1st GP Manavgat
 2nd Time trial, National Road Championships

Grand Tour general classification results timeline

References

External links

Profile on Quick Step's Official Website

Living people
1985 births
Belarusian male cyclists
Sportspeople from Vitebsk
Cyclists at the 2012 Summer Olympics
Olympic cyclists of Belarus
European Games competitors for Belarus
Cyclists at the 2019 European Games